Mane Kogma and Mane Yogma (also known as Mane Gogma/Gongma, Mane Yongma) are two small villages on opposite banks of a nullah in the cold desert region of Spiti in Himachal Pradesh, India. Due to the lush green fields visible only after climbing the barren slope, the villages are referred to as the "hidden treasure".

Mane is the base for trekking and mountaineering in the towering Manirang range that runs between Spiti and Kinnaur.  Mane Yogma is the last village in Spiti on the trail over the Manirang Pass to Kinnaur.

History 
As far back as 1994 when Indian mountaineer Harish Kapadia and his team passed through on an ascent of Manirang peak, they found the twin villages of Mane Kogma and Mane Yogma.Reportedly, at some time prior, there was one Mane village.  It was said to have been destroyed in a flash flood.  The village was rebuilt in two sections: Mane Kogma or lower village on the left bank of the nullah, and Mane Yogma or upper village on the right bank.

Geography

While the road up from Spiti traverses a barren rock-strewn slope devoid of vegetation, on reaching the plateau, the traveler is greeted by the sight of lush green fields irrigated by a nullah. The first or lower village on the road from the Spiti valley is Mane Kogma on the left bank of the nullah. The second or upper village at the end of the road is Mane Yogma on the right bank of the nullah. The straight line distance between the two villages is  while the road winds along the contours over a distance of  crossing the nullah via a steel girder bridge.

Himachal is prone to landslides due to the geologically young mountain slopes with loose sedimentary strata.  This is compounded by human activity such as terracing and construction of roads and buildings.  Residents report that agricultural land is subsiding and some buildings in Mane Yogma near the nullah are developing cracks.

This is the route on NH-505 from Manali.

Southwest of Mane is the  Manirang peak, one of the highest peaks in the state of Himachal Pradesh. Mane Yogma is the last village in Spiti on the trail to Kinnaur over the  Manirang Pass. In Spiti, the pass is named Ropak La, after the first village on the Kinnaur side. In Kinnaur, the name is Manirang after the first village on the Spiti side.

Demographics and amenities
Information on Mane from the Census of India 2011 is given in the table.

Mane Kogma and Mane Yogma are villages in the Dhankar Gram Panchayat. Schooling up to senior secondary (Classes 1-12) is available in Mane Yogma, with Mane Kogma having a primary school. Piped water supply is available, and the village has power and telephone connections. Mane Kogma has a branch post office.

The 34th Kalachakra, a periodic Buddhist workshop initiated by the Dalai Lama, was planned to be held in Dhankar Gompa in January 2017.  To serve the expected large numbers of monks and tourists from India and abroad, BSNL commissioned a base station tower (BTS) in Mane Gogma to serve Dankhar across the Spiti river.  The BTS was linked by satellite and powered by solar panels for uninterrupted telecom service. Although the 34th Kalachakra was subsequently held in Bodh Gaya, this plan gave a fillip to telecom service in the Mane villages and the surrounding areas.

Places of interest
The main attractions of the Mane villages are trekking, views of the surrounding mountains and valleys, and the solitude of village life.  Mane Yogma has a Buddhist Gompa.  Due to the high altitude and the absence of artificial lights, the nights afford good views of the stars.

Sopona Lake (formerly Yangcho Lake) is a  hike up a stream from Mane Yogma. The route up to the pass is rated as easy. On the other side, a steep trail descends through the Ropa valley of Kinnaur. From Manirang Pass, mountaineers can attempt to climb the  Manirang Peak, one of the highest mountains in Himachal Pradesh.

Accommodation
There are a few home stays and camp grounds in Mane Yogma.

Gallery

See also
 Spiti Valley

References

Villages in Lahaul and Spiti district